Jack Westelman (April 7, 1941 – November 28, 2013), known as Danny Wells, was a Canadian actor. He was best known for his role as Charlie, the bartender on The Jeffersons, as well as his role as Luigi in the live-action/animated series The Super Mario Bros. Super Show!.

Early life and career
Wells was born in Montreal, Canada to Eli Westelman (died April 4, 1996) and Eunice Trottenberg (died September 20, 1987) on April 7, 1941. His acting career spanned more than 4 decades, beginning in 1972 on the comedy television show Love, American Style.

In 1975 Wells made his film debut in The Strongest Man in the World. He then went on to appear in a string of successful movies including Private Benjamin (1980) starring Goldie Hawn and Eileen Brennan, The Woman in Red (1984) starring Gene Wilder, Magnolia (1999), and The Last Kiss (2006) where he played the Uncle of Michael Weston's character Izzy.

Over his prolific career, Wells did most of his work in television, starring or making guest appearances in more than 80 television shows and movies, including Sanford and Son, CHiPs, The A-Team, and The Fall Guy. In 1975, he starred in the most notable role of his career: "Charlie the Bartender", on the hit television show The Jeffersons. Wells played Charlie as a recurring role throughout the entire 11 season run until the show was cancelled in 1985.

In the 1970s, he portrayed the store manager in television ads for Kmart department stores. 

Wells began doing voice work in 1982 when he voiced the character of Stomper #1 in the Ralph Bakshi film Hey Good Looking. From there he went on to voice numerous characters for film, television and video games, including Descent 3 and Wizardry 8. His first television series was Heathcliff and The Catillac Cats (1984), which lead to the film Heathcliff: The Movie in 1986.

The Super Mario Bros. Super Show!
Wells voiced several other animated series such as Batman: The Animated Series, Grossology and Johnny Bravo, but it was in 1989 that Wells starred in and voiced the animated character that he is perhaps best remembered by younger audiences as Luigi from The Super Mario Bros. Super Show!.

In an interview with "Slam" magazine, Wells recalled the popularity of the show: "We went on the air, three o'clock in the afternoon, with no publicity or P.R. at all. There was no pre-build-up to this show, nothing ... they just threw us out there. In three weeks, we became number one. We beat Disney, we beat everybody, without any publicity, without any help from anybody, this show went to the number one daytime cartoon show. They put us up against Mickey Mouse, it didn't matter, we beat them. It was amazing."

In 2002, Wells starred as film executive Jack L. Warner in the made-for-television movie "Gleason" starring Brad Garrett as Jackie Gleason.

As composer, Wells wrote the music for the 1979 CBS TV movie Never Say Never starring George Kennedy and Anne Schedeen.

The Jeffersons

According to his cousin, television reviewer Alan Sepinwall, Wells worked steadily throughout the 1970s and 1980s. In 1975, Wells landed the role of "Charlie the Bartender" on the CBS television show The Jeffersons. His character, Charlie, owned "Charlie's Bar" on the first floor of the Colby East luxury apartment building where the Jeffersons and Willises resided. On the show, Wells' character would offer advice to the residents. A running gag throughout the show's run would be that someone (more often than not, Lionel) would be having drinks with George Jefferson (played by Sherman Hemsley), and Charlie would hand them the bill, as George would have already sneaked out before paying.

Charlie the Bartender quickly became a recurring role and towards the end of the series, he even had a few central episodes written specifically for him. In season 9, episode 5 ("Charlie's Angels"), Charlie borrows money from Tom Willis (played by Franklin Cover) in hopes of upgrading his bar and increasing business by way of risque dressed waitresses. Louise (played by Isabel Sanford) and Helen (played by Roxie Roker) take offense when they feel that the changes are exploiting the women. At the beginning of the final season, Charlie is facing eviction. George becomes partners with Charlie and buys the bar. In episode 17 of season 11, ("A Secret in the Back Room") it is discovered that Charlie has been sleeping in the back room due to a serious drinking problem that has separated him from his wife. George and Louise help him get his life back together. In another episode, Charlie's bar is just breaking even. Louise plans to put the bar back in the black with a private party for a biker gang ("The Gang’s All Here").

Death
Wells died in Toronto on November 28, 2013 of cancer at the age of 72. He was buried in Mount Sinai Memorial Park Cemetery in Los Angeles, California. For fans of The Super Mario Bros. Super Show!, Wells' death was poignant since it was Nintendo's "Year of Luigi" and the 30th Anniversary celebration of the character (1983). His obituary states that "Danny followed his dreams ... he made them laugh." Wells' headstone inscription reads: "Keep 'em laughing."

Filmography

Film

Television

Video games

References

External links
 
 Celebrities: Danny Wells
 List of The Jeffersons Characters
 

1941 births
2013 deaths
Canadian male film actors
Canadian male television actors
Canadian male voice actors
Deaths from cancer in Ontario
Jewish Canadian male actors
Male actors from Montreal
Burials at Mount Sinai Memorial Park Cemetery
20th-century Canadian male actors
21st-century Canadian male actors
Anglophone Quebec people